Dennis Edwards (1943–2018) was an American soul and R&B singer, notably a lead singer in The Temptations.

Dennis Edwards may also refer to:

Dennis Edwards (footballer) (1937–2019), inside forward, mostly for Charlton Athletic
Dennis Edwards (American football) (born 1959), defensive end for the Los Angeles Rams
Dennis Edwards Jr. (1921–2017), judge in New York City